Micah Williams may refer to:
 Micah Williams (painter) (1782–1837), American painter
 Micah Stephen Williams (born 1991), American actor
 Micah Williams, birth name of comedian, Katt Williams (born 1971)
 Micah Williams (sprinter) (born 2001), American sprinter

See also
Micah Williams House